Kristján  is an Icelandic masculine given name.

The Icelandic surname Kristjánsson is a patronymic surname meaning son of Kristján. Kristjánsdóttir is a patronymic surname meaning daughter of Kristján.

Notable people Kristján with the name include:

 Kristján Andrésson (born 1981), Icelandic handball player
 Kristján Arason (born 1961), Icelandic handball player
 Kristján Eldjárn (1916–1982), third President of Iceland
 Kristján Emilsson (born 1993), Icelandic footballer
 Kristján Einar (born 1989), Icelandic racing driver
 Kristján Finnbogason (born 1971), Icelandic football goalkeeper
 Kristján Guðmundsson (born 1941), Icelandic conceptual artist
 Kristján Helgason (born 1974), Icelandic snooker player
 Kristján Jóhannsson (born 1948), Icelandic operatic tenor
 Kristján B. Jónasson, Icelandic book publisher
 Kristján Jónsson (politician) (1852–1926), Minister for Iceland
 Kristján Þór Júlíusson (born 1957), Icelandic politician
 Kristján Karlsson (1922–2014), Icelandic poet
 Kristján L. Möller (born 1953), Icelandic politician
 Kristján Örn Sigurðsson (born 1980), Icelandic footballer

Icelandic masculine given names